Dominic Chanda (born  26 February 1996) is a Zambian professional footballer who plays as a defender for Kabwe Warriors and the Zambia national football team.

References 

1996 births
Living people
Zambian footballers
Zambia international footballers
Kabwe Warriors F.C. players
Association football defenders
Zambia A' international footballers
2020 African Nations Championship players